Guwahati railway station (Station code: GHY) is located in the heart of the city of Guwahati, Assam. It is the first fully solar-operated railway station in India. It has been rated as A1-category station. Just behind the Guwahati Railway Station is the Assam State Transport Corporation Bus Terminal.

An ISO-certified railway station, Guwahati Railway Station has been ranked 21 in cleanliness among the A1-category railway stations in India.

To reduce the traffic on the Guwahati junction, there is another railway station in the city at Maligaon, the Kamakhya railway station. Almost all newly introduced trains run from the Kamakhya Jn. railway station only. There were plans to make a new railway station at Beltola (in the southern part of Guwahati) to introduce trains towards Shillong, Meghalaya. Plans have not been finalized and are still in progress.

Guwahati railway station became the first railway station to run entirely on solar-power. The solar panel installation project was commissioned in April 2017. In recent years the railway station got a 100 feet high Tri colour. It is the tallest tricolour among any railway stations in north east India.

Services for rolling stock
The station has a diesel locomotive shed with room for 80 locomotives. The sheds accommodate WDM-3D, WDG-4D, WDG-4 and WDS class locomotives. The shed now also accommodates WDP-4D locomotives. The station has a coach maintenance complex.

Station facilities
The station is the divisional headquarters for the Northeast Frontier Railway.It became the first ever Railway station in the Indian Railways to get an ISO certification from the National Green Tribunal for "providing passenger amenities in a clean and green environment".

The station has seven platforms. It serves the long-distance trains of  NFR.
Google along with RailWire provided Free high speed Wifi until 2020. However, RailTel (RailWire's parent company) has confirmed that it will continue to provide free Wifi Internet services.

Following services available in Guwahati Railway Station:

 03 (02 Bedded) Delux AC Retiring Rooms with Free Wi-Fi/TV/Locker/Charging point 
 02 (02 Bedded) AC Retiring Rooms with Free Wi-Fi/TV/Locker 
 02 (05 Bedded) Non AC Retiring Rooms with Free Wi-Fi/TV/Locker 
 02 (02 Bedded) Non Ac Retiring Rooms with Free Wi-Fi/TV/Locker 
 01 (12 Bedded) Non AC Dormitory with Free Wi-Fi/TV/Locker 
 Reserve VIP Lounge
 Chemist Stall 
 High Speed  Google Railwire Free Wi-Fi service 
 Upper Class/Lower Class Waiting Rooms having Free Wi-Fi/AC/TV/Charging points/Drinking water & separate Ladies/Gents Washrooms 
 Veg/Non Veg Food Court 
 Cafeteria 
 FOB with 10X Escalators/Elevators  4X
 CCTV Surveillance
 Cloak Room

Major Trains
Dibrugarh Rajdhani Express
Dibrugarh-Kanyakumari Vivek Express
Avadh Assam Express
Agartala Rajdhani Express
Bangalore Humsafar Express
Aronai Superfast Express
Naharlagun Shatabdi Express
Dibrugarh Shatabdi Express
Saraighat Express
Kamrup Express
Kolkata Garib Rath Express
Amarnath Express
Poorvottar Sampark Kranti Express
Kaziranga Superfast Express
Dwarka Express
Lohit Express
Guwahati-Secunderabad Express
Bikaner-Guwahati Express
Silchar-Coimbatore Express
Dibrugarh-Chandigarh Express
Dibrugarh-Amritsar Express
Kanchanjunga Express
Tripura Sundari Express
Dibrugarh - Mumbai LTT Express
Barmer–Guwahati Express
New Tinsukia SMVT Bengaluru Express
New Tinsukia-Rajendra Nagar Weekly Express
Agartala Deoghar Express

References

External links

 

Railway stations in Guwahati
Railway junction stations in Assam
Lumding railway division
Railway stations in India opened in 1900
1900 establishments in India
Indian Railway A1 Category Stations